Bui Tien Dung may refer to:

 Bùi Tiến Dũng (politician) (born 1951), Vietnamese politician and war veteran
 Bùi Tiến Dũng (footballer, born 1995), Vietnamese football defender for Hoàng Anh Gia Lai F.C.
 Bùi Tiến Dũng (footballer, born 1997), Vietnamese football goalkeeper for FLC Thanh Hóa F.C.
 Bùi Tiến Dụng (born 1998), Vietnamese football midfielder for SHB Đà Nẵng F.C.